Orolestes is a genus of stalk-winged damselflies in the family Lestidae. There are about seven described species in Orolestes.

Species
These seven species belong to the genus Orolestes:

References

Further reading

External links

Lestidae
Articles created by Qbugbot